The Nuaulu, Naulu or Nunuhai are a tribe located in Seram, Maluku, Indonesia.

Description
The tribe name 'Nuaulu' means head[waters] of the Nua River, which is the ancestral homeland of the Nuaulu people. In the late 19th century or early 20th century, the Nuaulu people were moved down to the coast by the Dutch for purposes of pacification.

The Nuaulu are divided into two groups, namely the northern and the southern groups. Numbering at a total of 2500 people, they live in the Amahai district of Central Seram. The Northern Nuaulu inhabit two villages on the north coast of central Seram Island, whilst the Southern group inhabit five villages on the south coast and interior of Amahai District. These two languages are not mutually intelligible.

Religion 
The majority of the Nuaulu people still adhere to their traditional religion which is based on a belief that the ancestors control everyday life and if the traditions they handed down are not followed correctly the living will be punished with sickness, death, and lack of prosperity. Nuaulu religion also states that there is an original creator called Upu Kuanahatana, and that there is powerful magic which people can use for good, or bad, purposes. Nuaulu people build Baileo for spiritual purposes.

Culture
The Nuaulu people are often mistakenly referred to as the Manusela people, who like the Nuaulu people wear a traditional red cloth on their heads, speak a similar language and practice the same traditional beliefs, the Naurus.

The Nuaulu retained a custom of headhunting until the 1940s.

Livelihood
Sago is the staple food of the Nuaulu. Nuaulu are subsistence farmers who use shifting cultivation techniques; they also grow cash crops such as coconuts, cloves, and nutmeg.

Honors
The Nuaulu people are honored in the scientific name of a species of gecko, Cyrtodactylus nuaulu, which is native to Seram Island.

References

Further reading 

 Ellen, R. F. (1978). Nuaulu Settlement and Ecology: An Approach to the Environmental Relations of an Eastern Indonesian Community. Martinus Nijhoff. 

 Ellen, Roy (2006). The Cultural Relations of Classification: An Analysis of Nuaulu Categories from Central Seram. Cambridge University Press. 

 Bible/Alkitab: https://www.bible.com/bible/2330/GEN.1.ANA

External links
 Nuaulu.net

Ethnic groups in Indonesia
Maluku (province)
Seram Island
Headhunting
Central Maluku Regency